Kulakovka is a rural locality (a selo) in Tryokhprotoksky Selsoviet, Privolzhsky District, Astrakhan Oblast, Russia. The population was 1,365 as of 2010. There are 20 streets.

Geography 
Kulakovka is located 12 km west of Nachalovo (the district's administrative centre) by road. Astrakhan is the nearest rural locality.

References 

Rural localities in Privolzhsky District, Astrakhan Oblast